Emma Louise Humphries (born 14 June 1986) is a New Zealand association football player who represented her country at international level.

Humphries made her Football Ferns debut in a 0–4 loss to China on 16 November 2006, and represented New Zealand at the 2007 FIFA Women's World Cup finals in China, where they lost to Brazil 0–5, Denmark (0–2) and China (0–2).

Humphries also represented New Zealand at the 2006 Women's U-20 World Cup finals.

In 2021, Humphries became director of women's football development at Vancouver Whitecaps FC. She was appointed as the head coach of the U-17 national team in September of that year.

Humphries is married to English football coach Bev Priestman. Their son Jack was born in 2018.

References

External links

1986 births
2007 FIFA Women's World Cup players
Cal State Fullerton Titans women's soccer players
Coastal Carolina Chanticleers women's soccer players
LGBT association football players
New Zealand LGBT sportspeople
Living people
New Zealand women's association footballers
New Zealand women's international footballers
Women's association football midfielders